Georgi Tamazovich Margiyev (born 8 July 2000) is a Russian football player. He plays for FC Nosta Novotroitsk.

Club career
He made his debut in the Russian Football National League for FC Tyumen on 28 April 2019 in a game against FC Fakel Voronezh.

References

External links
 Profile by Russian Football National League
 
 

2000 births
Living people
Russian footballers
Association football midfielders
FC Tyumen players
FC Nosta Novotroitsk players
Russian First League players
Russian Second League players